Manolis Tzanakakis (born 30 April 1992) is a Greek professional footballer who plays as a right-back for Cypriot First Division club Karmiotissa Pano Polemidion.

Career
Tzanakakis started his football career at the infrastructure segments of Heraklion-based Superleague side Ergotelis, and signed his first professional contract with the club on 29 November 2011. Despite the club being relegated at the end of the season, Tzanakakis impressed with his subsequent stellar performances in the Greek Football League, drawing the attention of Greek champions Olympiacos, who arranged for both his, as well as teammate Andreas Bouchalakis' transfer in March 2013. After celebrating promotion to the Superleague at the end of the 2012–13 season with Ergotelis, Tzanakakis went on to sign a 4-year contract with Olympiacos in July 2013. He was immediately loaned out back to Ergotelis for another year, and once again in August 2014. In total, Tzanakakis amassed 100 caps with Ergotelis.

On 21 July 2015, Tzanakakis signed a one-year contract with Cypriot First Division side Anorthosis, again on loan from Olympiacos. He scored the first goal in his career on 27 April 2016, during a 1−1 championship draw vs. Apollon Limassol.

On 26 August 2016, Tzanakakis, released from his contract with Olympiacos, signed a two-year contract with Greek Football League club Aris.

On 29 December 2019, he signed a contract with Panetolikos, until the summer of 2021.

Career statistics

Club

References

External links
 Ergotelis squad at uefa.com
 

1992 births
Living people
Greek footballers
Greece under-21 international footballers
Greece youth international footballers
Ergotelis F.C. players
Anorthosis Famagusta F.C. players
Aris Thessaloniki F.C. players
Olympiacos F.C. players
Panetolikos F.C. players
Super League Greece players
Football League (Greece) players
Cypriot First Division players
People from Lasithi Plateau
Association football fullbacks
Footballers from Crete